The Aeroprakt A-36 Vulcan is a Ukrainian light aircraft, designed and produced by Aeroprakt of Kyiv. The aircraft is supplied as a complete ready-to-fly-aircraft.

Design and development
The A-36 is a development of the Aeroprakt A-26 Vulcan. The design goals for the A-36 include operations over hostile terrain, the ability to take-off and land with only one engine running and the ability to operate from short runways. The resulting design features a strut-braced high-wing, T-tail, a two-seats in tandem configuration enclosed cockpit, fixed conventional landing gear with wheel pants and twin engines in pusher configuration.

The aircraft is of mixed construction, with the forward fuselage made from fibreglass and the tail cone from aluminum sheet. The wings and tail are aluminum, while the main landing gear legs, engine cowlings and fairings are fibreglass. The standard engines used are the  Rotax 912S four-stroke powerplant.

Operational history
By December 2012 one example had been registered in the United States with the Federal Aviation Administration. It had previously been publicly exhibited at the April 2009 Sun 'n Fun aviation gathering at Lakeland, Florida.

Specifications (A-36 Vulcan)

References

External links

Twin-engined pusher aircraft
High-wing aircraft
Vulcan
2000s Ukrainian civil aircraft
T-tail aircraft